Bumetopia stolata is a species of beetle in the family Cerambycidae. It was described by Masaki Matsushita in 1931. It is known from Taiwan.

References

Homonoeini
Beetles described in 1931